Big City Blues may refer to:

Big City Blues (1932 film), a 1932 drama film directed by Mervyn LeRoy
Big City Blues (1997 film), a 1997 film starring Burt Reynolds
Big City Blues (2:00 AM Paradise Cafe#Track listing), a 1984 song by Barry Manilow
Howling Wolf Sings the Blues, re-released in 1970 by United Records as Big City Blues